"Dreamer" is a 1984 power ballad by the Swedish heavy metal band Europe. It was the second single from the Wings of Tomorrow album. The single was only released in Japan. It bears a strong resemblance to the hit single "Carrie" that was released two years later. This song is referenced in the song "Time Has Come" off the band's next album The Final Countdown in the lyric, "Pray for the dreamer/He's still so sad." In 1993 the song was included on their greatest hits compilation 1982–1992.

Track listing
"Dreamer"
"Lyin' Eyes"

Personnel
Joey Tempest − lead vocals, keyboards
John Norum − guitars, background vocals
John Levén − bass guitar
Tony Reno − drums

References

Europe (band) songs
1984 songs
1984 singles
Songs written by Joey Tempest
Heavy metal ballads